TVS Emerald Haven Realty Ltd is an Indian real estate company, based in Chennai, India. It was founded by and as the real estate arm of the TVS Group in 2012 and is headquartered in the Indian city of Chennai. TVS Emerald began its foray into real estate by successfully completing and delivering their first project, TVS Emerald Green Hills, in Perungalathur, ahead of schedule. It has since then announced several residential project in Chennai.

TVS Emerald is founded on the same principles that guide the TVS Group, one of India's biggest and most diversified conglomerates.

The TVS Group also owns TVS Motor Co, Ltd., the third largest two-wheeler maker in India.

References

Companies based in Chennai
Real estate companies of India
TVS Group
2010 establishments in Tamil Nadu
Indian companies established in 2010
Real estate companies established in 2010